William Oscar Owens (September 7, 1893 – April 30, 1960), nicknamed "Cannon Ball", was an American Negro league pitcher between 1921 and 1931.

A native of Reidsville, North Carolina, Owens made his Negro leagues debut with the Homestead Grays in 1921. He played 10 seasons with the Grays, and also played for the Pittsburgh Keystones in 1922. Owens died in Washington, D.C., in 1960 at age 66.

References

External links
 and Baseball-Reference Black Baseball stats and Seamheads

1893 births
1960 deaths
Homestead Grays players
Pittsburgh Keystones players
20th-century African-American sportspeople
Baseball pitchers